Adam Hellborg (born 30 July 1998) is a Swedish footballer who plays for IK Sirius.

Career

Club career
Hellborg's career started at Emmaboda IS but already in his early teens, he moved to Kalmar FF. After being on the bench already during the previous season, Hellborg made his Allsvenskan debut in a 3-0 victory against Malmö FF on 29 April 29 2018. He made a total of nine league appearances in 2018, including three from the start, and shortly after the season ended he signed a new two-year agreement with the club..

In April 2019, Hellborg was lent to Oskarshamns AIK through a cooperation agreement.

In December 2019, Hellborg was presented as a new player by IK Sirius.

References

External links 
 

Swedish footballers
1998 births
Living people
Allsvenskan players
Ettan Fotboll players
Kalmar FF players
Oskarshamns AIK players
IK Sirius players
Association football midfielders